Lifeline is an album by Ben Harper & the Innocent Criminals. It was recorded in Paris in the fall of 2006 after the lengthy European leg of the Both Sides of the Gun tour. Harper and the Innocent Criminals wrote the tracks while on tour and would rehearse the songs during sound checks while at each venue. Recorded in only seven days on analog, the album was released on August 28, 2007. It is Harper's eighth album.

Lifeline debuted at number 9 on the US Billboard 200 chart, selling about 41,000 copies in its first week. As of November 2008, the album has sold 173,000 copies in United States.

Thom Jurek at AllMusic described the album as "...a deeply focused, loose, and laid-back record that is musically compelling and deeply soulful, and contains some of Harper's finest songs to date".

Track listing
All songs written by Ben Harper & The Innocent Criminals, except "Paris Sunrise #7" and "Lifeline" written by Ben Harper.
"Fight Outta You" - 4:10
"In the Colors" - 2:57
"Fool for a Lonesome Train" - 3:30
"Needed You Tonight" - 2:46
"Having Wings" - 3:27
"Say You Will" - 2:58
"Younger Than Today" - 3:24
"Put It on Me" - 3:30
"Heart of Matters" - 4:31
"Paris Sunrise #7" - 5:17
"Lifeline" - 4:28

Musicians
 Ben Harper - guitars, vocals
 Juan Nelson - bass
 Oliver Charles - drums
 Michael Ward - guitar
 Jason Yates - keyboards
 Leon Mobley - percussion
 Michelle Haynes, Rovleta Fraser - backing vocals

Charts

Weekly charts

Year-end charts

Certifications and sales

References

2007 albums
Ben Harper albums
Virgin Records albums